Winston-Salem Southbound Railway Freight Warehouse and Office is a historic railway freight warehouse and office building located at Winston-Salem, Forsyth County, North Carolina.  It was built in 1913, and is a two-story, brick railroad building with a shallow gable roof and Italianate-style design elements.  It measures 40 feet by 224 feet. The building served until 1985 as headquarters for the Winston-Salem Southbound Railway. In 1990, the building was sympathetically renovated for office use.

It was listed on the National Register of Historic Places in 1991.

References 

Railway buildings and structures on the National Register of Historic Places in North Carolina
Italianate architecture in North Carolina
Buildings and structures completed in 1913
Buildings and structures in Winston-Salem, North Carolina
National Register of Historic Places in Winston-Salem, North Carolina
1913 establishments in North Carolina
Railway freight houses on the National Register of Historic Places